Tirnan (also Romanized as Tīrnān) is a village in Zaz-e Sharqi Rural District, Zaz va Mahru District, Aligudarz County, Lorestan Province, Iran. At the 2006 census, its population was 19, in 4 families.

References 

Towns and villages in Aligudarz County